"Baby" is a song written by Ray Griff and recorded by American country artist Wilma Burgess. It was released as a single in November 1965 via Decca Records.

Background and reception 
"Baby" was recorded at the Columbia Recording Studio on September 24, 1965. Located in Nashville, Tennessee, the session was produced by renowned country music producer Owen Bradley. Two additional tracks were recorded during this session.

"Baby" peaked at number seven on the Billboard Hot Country Singles chart in early 1966. The song became her first major hit and be one of several major hits for Burgess during the 1960s. "Baby" was issued on her debut studio album in 1966 entitled Don't Touch Me.

Track listings 
7" vinyl single
 "Baby" – 2:51
 "Wait Till the Sun Comes Up" – 2:05

Charts

Weekly charts

References 

1965 songs
1965 singles
Decca Records singles
Wilma Burgess songs
Songs written by Ray Griff